The Bras de la Rivière Saint-Denis is a tributary of the east bank of the Saint-Denis River which empties on the southeast bank of the Kamouraska River, which empties on the south shore of the St. Lawrence River two km east of the center of the village of Kamouraska.

The Bras de la Rivière Saint-Denis flows on the Côte-du-Sud in the municipalities of Mont-Carmel and Saint-Gabriel-Lalemant, in the Kamouraska Regional County Municipality, in the administrative region of Bas-Saint-Laurent, in province of Quebec, in Canada.

Geography 
Drawing its source from Lac des Marais in the municipality of Mont-Carmel, this watercourse flows generally to the north-west.

From its source, the Bras de la Rivière Saint-Denis flows over  entirely in a forest zone, divided into the following segments:
  west in Mont-Carmel, to the Canadian National railway bridge;
  north, to the mouth of Davidson Lake that the current crosses north; a marsh area borders the west side of the lake;
  west, up to a forest road;
  westward, to the southern limit of the municipality of Saint-Gabriel-Lalemant;
  north, up to its confluence.

Toponymy 
The toponym "Bras de la Rivière Saint-Denis" was formalized on December 2, 1982, by the Commission de toponymie du Québec.

See also 
 List of rivers of Quebec

References 

Rivers of Bas-Saint-Laurent
Kamouraska Regional County Municipality